The Escambia County Training School was a segregated school for African-American children in Atmore in Escambia County, Alabama.

History
Atmore Colored School was founded in 1920. In 1925, the community raised funds, which along with the Rosenwald fund provided means to build a six room wooden building plus a brick high school building. Around 30 years later, the school was merged with the city school. In 1969 new floors were added. The school was also known as the Rosenwald School. The last graduating class was in 1970, after integration of the public schools resulted in blacks being able to attend with whites. The remaining buildings on the site were built in 1959, 1980, and 1981. The site was used for the Escambia County Middle School from 1970 to 2000.

The girls basketball team won the state championship in 1951. The boys football team was undefeated in 1959. In 2016 the school was added to the Alabama Register of Landmarks and Heritage.

The school was located on 8th Avenue (which is now Martin Luther King Jr. Boulevard) between Broad Street and McGlasker.

In 2019 the site was the location of a mass shooting at a graduation party.

Notable alumni 
Dr. Woodrow M. Parker, Professor Emeritus University of Florida

Dr. Ulysses McBride, Past President of Bishop State Community College and Reid State Technical College

Willie J. Parker, renowned educator, coach, and author.

References

Historically segregated African-American schools in Alabama
Schools in Escambia County, Alabama
1920 establishments in Alabama
Educational institutions established in 1920